Blackstone-Millville Regional High School is a high school in Blackstone, Worcester County, Massachusetts, United States, operating as part of the Blackstone-Millville Regional School District. It serves both the town of Blackstone and its western neighbor, Millville.

History
The first high school in Blackstone was built in 1868 on School Street. It was replaced in 1920 with a new high school on Main Street. The Main Street building was expanded in 1938. As population in the area grew, regionalization was discussed as a way to provide a new high school for Blackstone and Millville. The Blackstone-Millville Regional School District, which regionalized grades 7-12, was approved by voters in both towns in 1967 and charged with planning and establishing a regional junior-senior high school to be located on Lincoln Street in Blackstone.

Following the sale of school district construction bonds, Blackstone-Millville Junior-Senior High School opened its doors in September 1970 serving students in grades 7 through 12 and the former high school building was retained by the district for use as an intermediate elementary school.

Blackstone and Millville maintained separate K-6 school committees until 1982, when school budget cuts resulting from Massachusetts Proposition 2½ going into effect pushed the towns to work out a plan to modify the regional district to establish a K-12 regional district, approved by voters at Special Town Meetings in April 1982. 
 The Blackstone-Millville Regional School District began operating as a K-12 regional district on July 1, 1982. When Frederick W. Hartnett Middle School opened in 2003, the high school realigned to serve students in grades 9 through 12.

Students

Demographics
As of the 2014-15 school year, the school had an enrollment of 457 students and 38.1 classroom teachers (on an FTE basis), for a student–teacher ratio of 12.0:1. There were 118 students (25.8% of enrollment) eligible for free lunch and 26 (5.7% of students) eligible for reduced-cost lunch.

Extracurricular activities

Athletics
The Blackstone-Millville Regional Chargers compete in the Dual Valley Conference.

The boys' cross-country team won 265 consecutive dual meets between 1974 and 1993, a national record that stood until 2004.

Marching band
The Blackstone-Millville Regional High School Chargers Marching Band has traveled throughout North America for national competitions and parades, including the National Cherry Blossom Festival, the Rose Parade, and the Macy's Thanksgiving Day Parade.

Championship titles won by the Marching Chargers include:
Group IV A "Silver" United States Scholastic Band Association: 2000, 2001
New England Scholastic Band Association winter percussion: 2013
Bands of America Regional Class A Championship in Towson, MD: 2013
Division 4 Open USBands National Championships: 2015, 2016,  2019, and 2021.

Notable people

Notable alumni
Jennifer Lanctot O'Neill (1986), mile champion at the 1991 NCAA indoor championships, Boston University's first three-time female All-American
Tim McNamara (1914), Major League Baseball pitcher

Notable faculty
Ambrose Kennedy, U.S. Representative from Rhode Island
Hurley Silbor, Massachusetts State Baseball Coaches' Hall of Fame inductee

References

External links
Blackstone-Millville Music Association

Public high schools in Massachusetts
Schools in Worcester County, Massachusetts
Buildings and structures in Blackstone, Massachusetts